Domenico Gerhard Gorgoglione (born 18 December 1963), known professionally as Nino de Angelo, is a German singer of Italian descent known for his 1983 chart-topper "Jenseits von Eden", and who participated in the Eurovision Song Contest 1989 with the song, "Flieger", written by Dieter Bohlen and Joachim Horn-Bernges.

He had a minor hit in 1984 in the UK Singles Chart with "Guardian Angel". Originally the song was recorded in German and written by Drafi Deutscher. Titled "Jenseits von Eden", it remained number one for ten weeks on the German chart in 1983, while an Italian version was number one in France for five weeks. He collaborated with German band Mr. President, performing a song called "Olympic Dreams" from their "We See the Same Sun" album. He participated in Eurovision Song Contest in 1989 with the song "Flieger", performed 21st in the night and finished 14th with 46 points. German punk band Die Ärzte covered the song "Jenseits Von Eden" on their self-titled album, released in 1986.

Discography

Albums
 1983: Junges Blut
 1984: Jenseits Von Eden
 1984: Nino
 1984: Zeit Für Rebelle
 1985: Time To Recover
 1986: Ich suche nach Liebe
 1987: Durch tausend Feuer
 1988: Baby Jane
 1989: Flieger
 1989: Samuraj
 1991: De Angelo
 1993: Verfluchte Zeiten
 2000: Schwindelfrei
 2002: Solange man liebt
 2003: Zurück nach vorn
 2004: Un Momento Italiano
 2005: Nino
 2012: Das Leben ist schön
 2014: Meisterwerke – Lieder meines Lebens
 2017: Liebe für immer
 2021: Gesegnet & verflucht

Singles (selected)
 1983: "Jenseits von Eden"
 1984: "Atemlos" / "Gar Nicht Mehr"
 1984: "Giganti" / "Tempo Verra"
 1984: "Guardian Angel"
 1984: "Unchained Love"
 1984: "Wir Sind Giganten" / "Zeit Für Rebellen"
 1989: "Flieger" / "Laureen"
 1989: "Samuraj"
 1989: "If There Is One Thing That's Forever"
 2001: "Engel"
 2002: "Ich mach' meine Augen zu (Everytime)" (with Chris Norman)
 2002: "Wenn du lachst"
 2004: "Komm zurück zu mir"
 2005: "Im Arm eines Engels"
 2005: "Wie der Wind"
 2006: "Wenn Du mich suchst"
 2007: "Dich holt niemand mehr zurück"
 2012: "Heiligenschein"
 2016: "So lang mein Herz noch schlägt"
 2017: "Liebe für immer"
 2020: "Gesegnet und verflucht"
 2021: "Zeit heilt keine Wunden"
 2023: "Mein Kryptonit"

References

External links

  
 

1963 births
Living people
Eurovision Song Contest entrants for Germany
Eurovision Song Contest entrants of 1989
German male singers
German people of Italian descent
Schlager musicians
Musicians from Karlsruhe